Tim Jacobus  (born April 21, 1959) is an American artist best known for illustrating the covers for nearly 100 books in R. L. Stine's Goosebumps series. He has done over 300 book covers and paintings for various different series, novels, and video games. He currently resides in New Jersey, doing most of his art digitally.

Works

Sources:

Null-A-Three - Book Cover (1985)
Star Trek: The Promethean Prophecy - Game Cover (1986)
Star Trek: First Contact - Game Cover (1988)
Green City in the Sun - Book Covers (1988)
Goosebumps - All Book Covers except #2 and #12 (1992-1997)
Goosebumps: Series 2000 - All Book Covers (1998-1999)
Goosebumps Triple Header books, Give Yourself Goosebumps #1, Tales To Give You Goosebumps, Goosebumps Live On Stage: Screams In The Night (1997-1998), (1995), (1994-1997), (1998)
Deadtime Stories - Various Book Covers (1996)
Bone Chillers - Various Book Covers (1998)
Spinetinglers- Various Book Covers (1995-1998)
Merry Christmas, Teletubbies! - Book Cover (1999)
Casket Case - Album Cover (2014)
Ravage - Return of the Spectral Rider - Album Cover (2017)
Frightland: The Wildman of Shaggy Creek - Book Cover (2021)

References

External links

 

20th-century American painters
American male painters
21st-century American painters
21st-century American male artists
American illustrators
Artists from New Jersey
1959 births
Living people
20th-century American male artists
Goosebumps